Iryna Husyak (born 30 April 1990 in Truskavets, Lviv Oblast, Ukraine) is a Ukrainian freestyle wrestler. She is a member of Spartak Lviv sports club. She is 2019 European champion.

References

External links
 FILA database

1990 births
Living people
Ukrainian female sport wrestlers
People from Truskavets
Universiade medalists in wrestling
Universiade silver medalists for Ukraine
European Wrestling Championships medalists
Medalists at the 2013 Summer Universiade
Sportspeople from Lviv Oblast
20th-century Ukrainian women
21st-century Ukrainian women